Simone Lo Faso (born 18 February 1998) is an Italian footballer who plays as a forward for  club Livorno.

Career
A technical second striker, Lo Faso joined the Palermo youth system at the age of 9.

He made his first team debut with Palermo on 12 August 2016 during a Coppa Italia game against Bari. On 6 November 2016 he also made his Serie A debut on a game against AC Milan, playing a total ten league games during the 2016–17 season.

In August 2017 he left Palermo to join ACF Fiorentina on loan, with the right for the Viola to buy the player permanently by the end of the season. However, he only managed to make two short first team appearances as a substitute throughout the whole 2017–18 Serie A campaign, and being mostly featured as part of the Under-19 team. In April 2018, he suffered a broken fibula which effectively ended his season and led Fiorentina to renounce its transfer rights. He therefore rejoined Palermo for the club's 2018–19 Serie B season.

On 25 July 2019, he signed to Serie A club Lecce. He made a single appearance for Lecce in Coppa Italia.

On 31 January 2020, he moved on loan to Cesena in Serie C, making only three appearances.

In January 2021, after spending the first half of the season back at Lecce with just a spare league first team appearance, he left the club by mutual consent.

On 25 February 2021 he joined Serie C side Pistoiese.

After finding himself without a contract following his short stint at Pistoiese, on 14 September 2021 Lo Faso signed a deal with Serie D amateurs Folgore Caratese.

After one season with Folgore Caratese, on 7 September 2022 Lo Faso signed for Serie D fallen giants Livorno.

References

External links
 

1998 births
Living people
Footballers from Palermo
Association football forwards
Italian footballers
Italy youth international footballers
Palermo F.C. players
ACF Fiorentina players
U.S. Lecce players
Cesena F.C. players
U.S. Pistoiese 1921 players
Serie A players
Serie B players
Serie C players